Staff-Sergeant Joseph John Davies  (28 April 1889 − 16 February 1976) was a British Army soldier and a British recipient of the Victoria Cross (VC), the highest and most prestigious award for gallantry in the face of the enemy that can be awarded to British and Commonwealth forces.

Davies was 27 years old, and a corporal in the 10th Battalion, Royal Welsh Fusiliers, British Army during the First World War when the following deed took place for which he was awarded the VC.

On 20 July 1916 at Delville Wood, France, prior to an attack on the enemy, Corporal Davies and eight men became separated from the rest of the company. When the enemy delivered their second counterattack, the party was completely surrounded, but Corporal Davies got his men into a shell hole and by throwing bombs and opening rapid fire he succeeded in routing the attackers, and even followed and bayoneted them in their retreat.

He later achieved the rank of staff-sergeant. After demobilisation from the Regular Army he joined the 1st Battalion, The Herefordshire Regiment, Territorial Army (TA) regiment, until the mid 1920s.

His VC is displayed at the Royal Welch Fusiliers Museum in Caernarfon Castle, Gwynedd, Wales.

References

Monuments to Courage (David Harvey, 1999)
The Register of the Victoria Cross (This England, 1997)
VCs of the First World War - The Somme (Gerald Gliddon, 1994)

External links
Location of grave and VC medal (Dorset)

1889 births
1976 deaths
Military personnel from Staffordshire
Herefordshire Light Infantry soldiers
British Battle of the Somme recipients of the Victoria Cross
Royal Welch Fusiliers soldiers
British Army personnel of World War I
People from Tipton
Recipients of the Order of St. George
Welch Regiment soldiers
British Army recipients of the Victoria Cross